Elizabeth Brice may refer to:
Elizabeth Brice, later Elizabeth Amadas (died 1532), lady at the royal court of King Henry VIII of England
Elizabeth Brice (1957–2011), cannabis activist who wrote as Clare Hodges
Elizabeth Brice (performer) (c. 1885–1965), American musical-comedy singer and dancer
Liz May Brice (born 1975), English actress